Arnedo is the third largest town in La Rioja, Spain. It is located near Calahorra, and has a population of about 15,000 people.

Its economy is based on the shoe industry.

History
The area of Arnedo has been inhabited as early as the Neolithic Age. In pre-Roman times it was known as Sadacia or Sidacia, while the current name derives from the Latin Arenetum ("Place of sand"); the Romans, who arrived here in the 2nd century BC replacing the Celtiberians, built here a fortification to defend the hill, which commanded an important communication hub. Of the Visigothic Age are remains of a 6th-century cave-church.

The Moors conquered Arnedo in the 8th century AD and made it the capital of one of the 26 provinces in which they divided Iberia. The town was conquered by the Christian king Sancho I of Pamplona in 908-909.

On 5 January, 1932, there was a clash between the Guardia Civil and a group of striking workers. The police fired into the crowd killing 11 people and wounding another 30.

Main sights
 Ruins of the castle
 Church of St. Thomas
 Church of St. Cosmas and Damian, housing a Baroque high altar
 Church of St. Eulalia
 Monastery of Nuestra Señora de Vico, situated some 4 km outside the city
 Gate of Nuestra Señora de la Nieves
 Museum of Shoes

Politics

Notable people
 Musa ibn Musa al-Qasawi
 Leopoldo Alas Mínguez
 Jesús Ángel Solana

Twin towns
 Andosilla, Spain
 Parthenay,  France
 Elda, Spain
 Farsia, Western  Sahara

See also
 Enciso, La Rioja
 List of municipalities in La Rioja

References

Municipalities in La Rioja (Spain)